The Stuart-Menteth Baronetcy, of Closeburn in the County of Dumfries and Mansfield in the County of Ayr, is a title in the Baronetage of the United Kingdom. It was created on 11 August 1838 for Charles Stuart-Menteth. The third baronet was a naturalised American. Current family James William Francis Stuart-Menteth, Abigail Jane Stuart-Menteth (1975-2021), Audrey Plum Stuart-Menteth, Martha Isabelle Francis Stuart-Menteth 

The Menteths descend from ancient Earls or Mormaers of Menteith, and more specifically from the marriage in 1260 of Mary, Countess of Menteth with Walter Bailloch Stewart, son of Walter Stewart, 3rd High Steward of Scotland. The Stuart name was not adopted until 1770, when the first baronet's father, Rev. James Menteth, adopted the name and arms from his cousin Charles Stuart in order to inherit his estates.

Stuart-Menteth baronets, of Closeburn and Mansfield (1838)
Sir Charles Granvill Stuart-Menteth, 1st Baronet (1769–1847)
Sir James Stuart-Menteth, 2nd Baronet (1792–1870)
( Sir ) James Stuart-Menteth ( 3rd Baronet), (1841–1918)
Sir James Frederick Stuart-Menteth, 4th Baronet (1846–1926)
Sir William Frederick Stuart-Menteth, 5th Baronet (1874–1952)
Sir James Wallace Stuart-Menteth, 6th Baronet (1922–2008)
Sir Charles Greaves Stuart-Menteth, 7th Baronet (born 1950)

The heir presumptive is the present holder's brother William Jeremy Stuart-Menteth (born 1953).
The heir presumptive's heir apparent is his son James William Stuart-Menteth (born 1987). Children Audrey Stuart-Menteth (born 2006), Martha Stuart-Menteth (born 2004).

See also
Clan Stewart
Earl of Menteith

References

Baronetcies in the Baronetage of the United Kingdom
1838 establishments in the United Kingdom
Clan Stewart